Robert Keith Bryan Hird (25 November 1939 – 1967), known as Keith Hird, was an English footballer who played in the Football League as a goalkeeper for Sunderland and Darlington. He also played non-league football for Annfield Plain.

Hird was born in Annfield Plain, County Durham, and played for his hometown club before joining Sunderland in 1957. His only first-team appearance was in the last match of the 1960–61 Football League season – replacing the previously ever-present Peter Wakeham – in a 1–1 draw away to Liverpool in the Second Division. He left the club in 1963, played 17 Fourth Division matches in his only season with Darlington, and returned to Annfield Plain. Hird died in 1967 at the age of 27.

Notes

References

1939 births
1967 deaths
People from Annfield Plain
Footballers from County Durham
English footballers
Association football goalkeepers
Annfield Plain F.C. players
Sunderland A.F.C. players
Darlington F.C. players
English Football League players